Satan's Hollow is a fixed shooter released in arcades by Bally Midway in 1982 and subsequently ported to the Commodore 64. The arcade game uses the same flight-controller style joystick with built-in trigger as Midway's Tron, released the same year.

Gameplay
The player must shoot flying formations of gargoyles in order to pick up pieces of a bridge that must be built over a river of lava. Once the bridge is completed, the player can cross it to face Satan. Destroying him scores bonus points based on the number of waves completed to that point, and also upgrades the rocket launcher. The player then resumes the battle against the gargoyles and must start building a new, longer bridge in order to fight Satan again. The sky darkens on later waves, making it more difficult to see the enemies, then lightens again.

As the game progresses, the gargoyles begin to throw exploding eggs, along with rocks that can destroy bridge sections; the player also occasionally faces disembodied devil heads that float around the screen and spit fire. In addition to firing rockets at the enemies, the player can use a shield that will destroy any enemy touching it. However, this shield can only be used for a short time before it must shut down to recharge. Gargoyles will sometimes attempt to steal a ship from the player's reserves, and must be destroyed before reaching the top of the screen in order to avoid losing a life.

Reception
French magazine Tilt rated the arcade game four out of six stars in 1983.

Legacy
Atari 8-bit family and Atari 5200 versions were completed and advertised by CBS software, but never released.

The game is included in the Midway Arcade Treasures collection, released in 2003 for PlayStation 2, GameCube and Xbox, and in 2004 for Windows. It was also included in the Midway Arcade Origins collection, released in 2012 for PlayStation 3 and Xbox 360.

References

External links
Satan's Hollow at Arcade History

Armchair Arcade TV: Episode 3 - Satan's Hollow

1982 video games
Arcade video games
Commodore 64 games
Cancelled Atari 8-bit family games
Fiction about the Devil
Gargoyles in popular culture
Midway video games
Fixed shooters
Video games about demons
Video games developed in the United States
Multiplayer and single-player video games